Royal Bengal Rahashya may mean

Royal Bengal Rahashya (novel)
Royal Bengal Rahasya (film)